This article uses Logar transcription.

The Lower Carniolan dialect is a major Slovene dialect in the Lower Carniolan dialect group. It is one of the two central Slovene dialects and was the original foundation for standard Slovene along with the Ljubljana urban dialect. It is spoken in most of Lower Carniola, but not in the southern part (it is not spoken in towns such as Babno Polje, Kočevje, and Semič), and it also includes settlements in eastern Inner Carniola. The dialect borders the Upper Carniolan dialect to the north, the Lower Sava Valley dialect to the east, Eastern Herzegovian Shtokavian and the North White Carniolan dialect to the southeast, the Mixed Kočevje subdialects to the south, the Čabranka dialect to the southwest, the Inner Carniolan dialect to the west, and the Horjul dialect to the northwest. The eastern part of the dialect is the Eastern Lower Carniolan subdialect. The dialect belongs to the Lower Carniolan dialect group, and it evolved from the Lower Carniolan dialect base.

Geographical distribution 
The area where the Lower Carniolan dialect is spoken spans from the Javornik Hills and Snežnik Plateau in the west to Orehovec, Škocjan, and Polšnik in the east, and to the Sava River and Ljubljana Marsh in the north. In the southeast, the border goes along the Gorjanci Mountains, in the south roughly past the area where the Gottschee Germans used to live, and in the southwest it extends almost to the national border, but places like Babno Polje and Lazec already speak the Čabranka dialect. Notable settlements include Cerknica, Stari Trg pri Ložu, Sodražica, Ribnica, Velike Lašče, Borovnica, Ig, Škofljica, Grosuplje, Turjak, Šmartno pri Litiji, Ivančna Gorica, Žužemberk, Dolenjske Toplice, Novo Mesto, Mirna Peč, Mirna, Šentrupert, Mokronog, Trebelno, Škocjan, Šmarješke Toplice, and Šentjernej. The subdialect border roughly follows the line Vinja Vas–Češča Vas–Dobrnič–Račje Selo–Tihaboj–Zaloka.

Historically it was also spoken in Ljubljana because in the past the Ljubljana dialect displayed features more similar with the Lower Carniolan dialect group.  However, it gradually grew closer to the Upper Carniola dialect group as a consequence of migration from Upper Carniola into Ljubljana in the 19th and 20th centuries. Ljubljana mostly expanded to the north, gradually incorporating many villages that were historically part of Upper Carniola, and so its dialect shifted closer to the Upper Carniolan dialects.

Accentual changes 
The Lower Carniolan dialect is the most archaic dialect in the Lower Carniolan dialect group because it has undergone only the  →  accent shift and partially the  →  accent shift, whereas other dialects have undergone five or even more, with an exception being the Mixed Kočevje subdialects. It has also retained pitch accent and has relatively well-preserved quantitative differences between long and short syllables. The long acute on final syllables remains acute only around Ribnica, Sodražica, Ig, and Grosuplje. In other parts, the acute starts to turn into a circumflex accent, but this is mostly limited to specific endings. In the dialect, change also occurs outside of endings, and in the south, around Novo Mesto, it has generally turned into a circumflex. Around Žužemberk, the accent did not change into a circumflex, but instead both accents neutralized.

Phonology 
The modern dialect mostly retained the same pronunciation of long vowels as in the Lower Carniolan dialect base. Alpine Slavic and later lengthened  and  turned into ,  and non-final  turned into , and long  turned into . Syllabic  turned into , which might also be more a-like. Syllabic  turned into . Newly stressed  opened up to  around Ribnica, whereas  closed into  around Žužemberk, Ribnica, and Ig, or became a diphthong  around Velike Lašče.

Word-final short  turned into  (ukanye), in the north further reducing into , or even disappeared. Akanye is also common; it is present in all positions in the northern and central microdialects and in all positions except after labial and velar consonants in the northeastern microdialects, where it changes into . Elsewhere, it mostly appears in close syllables after the stress. In parts where akanye is present in all positions, change of  into  after palatal consonants was also present, but that change is being abandoned by younger generations. In the north,  and  reduced into a somewhat lighter .

Shvapanye ( → ) is present only in a small area south of Ljubljana; elsewhere  remained intact.

Morphology 
The long infinitive turned into the short infinitive, except on the eastern border. The neuter gender mostly remained neuter, but partial masculinization occurs in the north.

Subdivision 

The eastern part of the Lower Carniolan dialect has some distinctive features that differentiate it from other parts of the dialect. Tonal accent is more or less lost on last syllables, and there is a partial  →  shift. Yat monophthongized,  and  widened or diphthongized, and there is a higher degree of vowel reduction.

References

Bibliography 

 
 

Slovene dialects
Lower Carniola